The 2009 Yugra Cup was a professional tennis tournament played on indoor carpet courts. It was the first edition of the tournament which was part of the 2009 ATP Challenger Tour. It took place in Khanty-Mansiysk, Russia between 30 November and 6 December 2009.

ATP entrants

Seeds

 Rankings are as of November 23, 2009.

Other entrants
The following players received wildcards into the singles main draw:
  Ruslan Bekoev
  Marcel Granollers
  Anton Manegin
  Yury Vaschenko

The following players received entry from the qualifying draw:
  Mikhail Fufygin
  Ivo Klec
  Andrey Kumantsov
  Artem Sitak

Champions

Singles

 Konstantin Kravchuk def.  Marcel Granollers, 1–6, 6–3, 6–2

Doubles

 Marcel Granollers /  Gerard Granollers-Pujol def.  Evgeny Kirillov /  Andrey Kuznetsov, 6–3, 6–2

External links
ITF search 
2009 Draws

Yugra Cup
2009 in Russian tennis
Yugra Cup